Jesse Andrews (born September 15, 1982) is an American novelist and screenwriter. He co-wrote the screenplay for Luca and wrote both the novel and the feature-film adaptation of Me and Earl and the Dying Girl.

Personal life 
Andrews was born and raised in Pittsburgh, Pennsylvania, and is a graduate of both Schenley High School and Harvard University. His family is Jewish.

He learned jazz in high school.

He currently resides in Berkeley, California.

Selected texts

Me and Earl and the Dying Girl (2012) 

Andrews's debut novel, Me and Earl and the Dying Girl, was published by Harry Abrams in 2012 and won that year's Cybils Award for Young Adult Fiction.

The Haters (2016) 
The Haters was published by Amulet Books in April 2016. Andrews said that he was inspired by his own experience with road-travelling bands.

In 2022, The Haters was listed among 52 novels banned by the Alpine School District following the implementation of Utah law H.B. 374, “Sensitive Materials In Schools."

Screenwriting 
Andrews's first produced screenplay was the feature-film adaptation of his debut novel Me and Earl and the Dying Girl, which was directed by Alfonso Gomez-Rejon and produced by Indian Paintbrush. It premiered at the 2015 Sundance Film Festival, where it won both the Audience Award (U.S. – Dramatic) and the Grand Jury Prize (U.S. – Dramatic).

He also wrote the adaptation of David Levithan's novel, Every Day. The movie Every Day was directed by Michael Sucsy and starred Angourie Rice.

More recently, Andrews wrote the screenplay and story for Pixar's computer-animated film Luca, with Mike Jones.

Publications

 Me and Earl and the Dying Girl (2012)
 The Haters (2016)
 Munmun (2018)

References

External links
 

Living people
1982 births
21st-century American novelists
American male screenwriters
Jewish American screenwriters
Harvard University alumni
American male novelists
21st-century American male writers
21st-century American screenwriters
21st-century American Jews